Kimbolton is a rural village north of Feilding in the Manawatu District of the North Island of New Zealand.  Kimbolton is named after Kimbolton, Cambridgeshire, a village in England which is the site of Kimbolton Castle, once the home of the Duke of Manchester. It was originally called Birmingham, after Birmingham, England.

The soil and climate in the area is ideal for rhododendrons and there are two rhododendron gardens in the area, including the former garden of the New Zealand Rhododendron Association, which was largely built by John Stuart Yeates, now called Heritage Park.

Amenities in the town include a cafe, a bowling green, a native reserve, and a rugby ground.

The small farming settlement of Āpiti lies immediately to the north of Kimbolton.

Demographics

The population of Kimbolton was 228 in the 2018 New Zealand census, an increase of 24 (11.8%) since the 2013 census, and an increase of 30 (15.2%) since the 2006 census. There were 114 males and 114 females, giving a sex ratio of 1.0 males per female. Ethnicities were 216 people  (94.7%) European/Pākehā, 24 (10.5%) Māori, 3 (1.3%) Pacific peoples, and 3 (1.3%) Asian (totals add to more than 100% since people could identify with multiple ethnicities). Of the total population, 48 people  (21.1%) were under 15 years old, 30 (13.2%) were 15–29, 111 (48.7%) were 30–64, and 42 (18.4%) were over 65.

Education

References

Manawatu District
Populated places in Manawatū-Whanganui